Cardwell is a civil parish in Kings County, New Brunswick, Canada.

The local service district was a member of Regional Service Commission 8 (RSC8).

Origin of name
The parish was named in honour of Viscount Cardwell, British Secretary of State for War until two months before the parish's erection.

History
Cardwell was erected in 1874 from Sussex Parish.

Boundaries
Cardwell Parish is bounded:

on the northwest by a line beginning at the northeastern corner of a grant to Jacob Smith, about 975 metres north of the junction of Plumweseep Road and Back Road, then running north 66º east to the Westmorland County line;
on the east by the Westmorland and Albert County lines;
on the south by a line beginning on the Albert County line at a point on the prolongation of the north line of a grant to Thomas Nicholson on the eastern side of Morton Road, west-southwesterly of Mechanic Lake, then running west-southwesterly along the prolongation and the grant line to the northwestern corner of the grant, then north-northwesterly to the northeastern corner of a grant to David Law on the southern side of the Law Road, then west-southwesterly along grant lines south of the Picadilly Road to the Sussex Parish line, southeast of DeCourcey Lake;
on the west by a line beginning at a point on the eastern line of a large grant to Elias Snyder, then running northerly along the grant line and its prolongation to the Kennebecasis River, then downstream about 300 metres past the Horton Road to the eastern line of the Jacob Smith grant, then northerly along the grant to the starting point.

Governance
The entire parish forms the local service district of the parish of Cardwell, established in 1968 to assess for fire protection. Recreational and sports facilities was added to the assessment in 2012. First aid and ambulance services were listed from 1972 until the description was rewritten in 2012.

Communities
Communities at least partly within the parish;

Anagance
Buckley Settlement
Crockets Corner
Dunsinane
Five Points
Harper Settlement
Lindys
McCully
Mechanic Settlement
Penobsquis
Picadilly
Portage Vale
South Branch
Springdale
Upper Goshen

Bodies of water
Bodies of water at least partly in the parish:
Anagance River
Kennebecasis River
South Branch
Mechanic Lake

Other notable places
Parks, historic sites, and other noteworthy places at least partly in the parish.

 Picadilly Mountain Protected Natural Area

Demographics
Revised census figures based on the 2023 local governance reforms have not been released.

Population
Population trend

Language
Mother tongue (2016)

Access Routes
Highways and numbered routes that run through the parish, including external routes that start or finish at the parish limits:

Highways

Principal Routes

Secondary Routes:

External Routes:
None

See also
List of parishes in New Brunswick

Notes

References

Parishes of Kings County, New Brunswick
Local service districts of Kings County, New Brunswick